The xx are an English indie rock band from Wandsworth, London, formed in 2005. The band consists of Romy Madley Croft (guitar, vocals), Oliver Sim (bass guitar, vocals), Jamie Smith, also known as Jamie xx (beats, MPC, record production), and formerly Baria Qureshi (keyboard, guitar). They are known for their distinct and minimalist sound that blends indie rock, indie electronic, indie pop, dream pop and electro-rock and the dual vocalist setup of both Croft and Sim. Their music employs soft, echoed guitar, prominent bass, light electronic beats and ambient soundscape backgrounds.

The band was formed when Croft and Sim met during their time at Elliott School, with Baria Qureshi joining the same year and Smith a year later. After posting demos on their Myspace page, they drew the attention of the Beggars Group-owned label Young Turks (now Young). Working with producer Rodaidh McDonald, the band released their debut album, xx, in August 2009. The album was a commercial and critical success, reaching number three on the UK Albums Chart, ranking first for The Guardians and second for NMEs best of the year lists among others, and winning the Mercury Prize in 2010. After their debut, Qureshi left the group and their second album, Coexist, was released on 5 September 2012 to positive reviews, reaching number one in the UK and number five on the Billboard 200. After a four-year lapse between releases, including Smith's solo debut in 2015, In Colour, the band released their third album, I See You, on 13 January 2017, which debuted to critical acclaim and peaked at number one in the UK and number two on the Billboard 200.

History

2005–2009: Formation 
The band members met while studying at Elliott School, the same school attended by Hot Chip, Burial, Four Tet, actor Pierce Brosnan, Fleetwood Mac founder Peter Green and singer Matt Monro. The group has downplayed the influence of the school on its career: "A teacher from Elliott who had never even taught us said how great we were. It's a bit annoying. We were left alone, more than anything – although I'm sure that helped us in its own way." Oliver Sim and Romy Madley Croft started the band as a duo when they were 15. Guitarist Baria Qureshi joined once it began performing in 2005, with Jamie Smith, also known as Jamie xx, joining a year after. Smith, although schoolfriends with Croft, Sim and Qureshi, joined the band after being formally introduced by their now label, Young Turks (now Young).

2009–2011: xx and Qureshi's departure 

The xx's debut album xx was released on 14 August 2009 through the British independent record label Young Turks,
and was met with critical acclaim. The album ranked on best of the year lists, ranking ninth on the Rolling Stone list and second for NME. In the 2009 NME The Future 50 list, the xx was positioned at number six, and in October 2009, it was named one of MTV Iggy's "Top 10 Bands with Buzz" (at the CMJ Music Marathon 2009). "Crystalised" was featured on iTunes (UK) as Single of the Week, starting from 18 August 2009.

Though the band had previously worked with producers including Diplo and Kwes, Smith produced xx and co-mixed with Rodaidh McDonald. The xx recorded its first album in a small garage that was part of the XL Recordings studio, often at night.

In August 2009, the band headlined its own concert tour. The xx has toured with artists including Friendly Fires, The Big Pink, and Micachu. In January 2010, Matt Groening chose the band to play at the All Tomorrow's Parties festival which he curated in Minehead, England. In addition, the band played at five music festivals in the United States, Coachella, Sasquatch, Bonnaroo, Lollapalooza and Austin City Limits.

In late 2009, second guitarist and keyboardist Baria Qureshi left the group. Initial reports stated that this was due to exhaustion, but Oliver Sim later said that the rest of the band had made this decision: "Also to be fair to her, people have an idea about that she left the band. She didn't. It was a decision that me, Romy, and Jamie made. And it had to happen."

The music of its debut album was used extensively on television and in the media, such as 24/7, Person of Interest, NBC's coverage of the 2010 Winter Olympic Games; during the series Cold Case, Suits, Mercy, the Greek version of Next Top Model, Bedlam, Hung, 90210, as well as being the feature song for the March 2010 E4 advert for 90210, Misfits, the Karl Lagerfeld fall/winter 2011 fashion show, Waterloo Road, and the film I Am Number Four. In May 2010, the track "Intro" was used by the BBC in its coverage of the 2010 general election. This led to the band playing the track on an episode of Newsnight. The track was also played before the UEFA Euro 2012 and UEFA Euro 2016 matches at stadiums in Poland, Ukraine, and France and featured during the end of Top Gear season 19 episode 6 "Africa Special Part 1". Dimitri Vegas & Like Mike and Sander van Doorn's 2012 single "Project T", which launched the Tomorrowland 2012 aftermovie, contains samples from "Intro"; van Doorn had earlier released a remix of the song in 2010. The song was also sampled in Rihanna's "Drunk on Love" from her album Talk That Talk and was featured in the films It's Kind of a Funny Story and Project X.

In September 2010, xx won the Mercury Prize. After the live ceremony screening, the album jumped from 16 to 3 on 12 September UK album chart, accompanying a 269% sales increase. XL's marketing campaign drastically expanded after this substantial win, with day-time TV advertisements and billboard campaigns on some of the UK's highest-profile digital billboards. Thanks to the highlighted publicity, XL Recordings says that it shipped more than 40,000 CDs in the days following the Mercury Prize. XL managing director Ben Beardsworth explained, "Thanks to the Mercury win... things are accelerating dramatically and the band will be reaching a bigger and bigger audience with their music." In another promotional initiative, the label sent out Saam Farahmand's audio/visual sculpture of the album when the band toured at Bestival 2010, as well as to an event at Seoul.

The xx was nominated for 'Best British Album', 'Best British Breakthrough' and 'Best British Band' at the 2011 BRIT Awards held on 15 February 2011 at the O2 Arena in London, although it did not win in any of the categories.

2011–2012: Coexist 

In December 2011, Smith revealed that he wanted to release the xx's second album ahead of its festival appearances the following year, and that it was inspired by "club music". "The majority of stuff I'm working on now is the xx stuff. We're just about to start recording. Hopefully we'll get it done in time for most festivals next year, because that's the most fun." Discussing the sound of the album, he said: "We've all come back off tour and been partying a bit more. We left when we were 17 and we missed out on that chunk of our lives when everyone else was partying. Club music has definitely had an influence on the next record."

On 1 June 2012, it was announced that the follow-up, Coexist, would be released on 10 September. On 16 July 2012, it announced and released "Angels" as the lead single from Coexist. On 3 September 2012, in a collaboration with Internet Explorer, the xx released Coexist to stream on its website until the worldwide release date on 11 September.

In August 2012, the xx was featured on the cover of issue number 81 of The Fader.

The xx performed at Bestival on 9 September 2012 in front of the largest crowd at the festival. Its first North American tour started on 5 October in Vancouver, Canada, with dates throughout the US and Mexico.

2013–present: Touring, side projects, and I See You 

In 2013, the xx held a series of three festival-style concerts, called "Night + Day", in Berlin, Lisbon, and London. The festivals featured performances and DJ sets curated by the band, including Kindness and Mount Kimbie. Each festival culminated in a nighttime concert by the band. The band was nominated for a Brit Award for Best British Group, eventually losing out to Mumford & Sons.

In April 2013, the xx contributed the song "Together" to the official soundtrack to Baz Luhrmann's adaptation of The Great Gatsby. In March 2014, the xx performed a series of shows at the Park Avenue Armory in New York City. The show featured live visual effects and had a limited capacity.

In May 2014, the band revealed that they were working on their third studio album, working with producer Rodaidh McDonald at the Marfa Recording Company studio in Texas.

In May 2015, Jamie xx said that his debut album In Colour "has definitely informed what we're doing for the next album." The band also reported that the record will have "a completely different concept" than their previous records. In November 2015, the band stated that they would continue working on the record through December and it will be released in 2016. On 6 October 2016, it was reported the band was planning to release new music "before the holidays." On 10 October 2016, they announced that they were still working on the third album, but shared a playlist and added tour dates.

In November 2016, the xx announced that the release of their third studio album, I See You, would be on 13 January 2017. They released the album's lead single "On Hold" at the same time. On 19 November 2016, the xx appeared as the musical guest on Saturday Night Live. They performed the songs "On Hold" and "I Dare You". On 2 January 2017, the band released the album's second lead single "Say Something Loving".

In November 2016, UK and European tour dates were announced for the new album. On 25 November 2016 the band announced an extended residency at the O2 Academy, Brixton – adding four additional days to their original tour and setting the record for longest run of sold-out shows in the venue's history.

I See You was nominated for IMPALA's European Album of the Year Award.

In 2020, Croft recorded backing vocals on the song "We Will Sin Together" on Jehnny Beth's debut solo album, To Love Is to Live, and released her debut single, "Lifetime".

Sim released his debut album, Hideous Bastard, on 9 September 2022 through Young. It was produced by Jamie xx.

Musical style and influences 
The xx has been described as various genres, including indie rock indie pop, indie electronic, R&B, dream pop, and electro-rock, while incorporating elements of post-punk and dance. The band members have cited several artists in their influences. Croft said: "Jamie started out very much into soul and then from there moved into hip-hop and UK-based dance music. He brings some much lower frequencies of bass into the band. And then I've grown up listening to Siouxsie and the Banshees, and The Cure. We're really quite a huge melting pot of different stuff." She also had mentioned her liking for Jimi Hendrix, The Slits, Joy Division, Yazoo, Eurythmics and New Order. Croft also added that the xx have been inspired by CocoRosie, The Kills and Electrelane. When signing to their label, they discovered bands like Cocteau Twins. They also expressed admiration for Beyoncé. Sim is an avid fan of Aaliyah, with the band covering her song "Hot Like Fire", while Croft enjoys Mariah Carey's music.

Band members 
Current members
 Romy Madley Croft – vocals, guitar 
 Oliver Sim – vocals, bass guitar 
 Jamie xx – synthesizers, drums, keyboards, samplers, sequencers, production 

Former members
 Baria Qureshi – keyboards, guitar

Awards and nominations
{| class=wikitable
|-
! Year !! Awards !! Work !! Category !! Result !! Ref.
|-
| rowspan=6|2009
| Žebřík Music Awards
| rowspan=3|Themselves 
| Best International Discovery
| 
| 
|-
| rowspan=3|Rober Awards Music Poll
| Breakthrough Artist 
| 
|-
| Best Pop Artist 
| 
|-
| rowspan=2|xx
| Album of the Year
| 
| 
|-
| Best Art Vinyl
| Best Vinyl Art
| 
| 
|-
| rowspan=2|UK Music Video Awards
| "Basic Space"
| Best Visual Effects 
| 
|-
| rowspan="5"|2010
| "Islands"
| Best Indie/Alternative Video 
| 
|-
| Mercury Prize
| xx
| Album of the Year
| 
|-
| NME Awards
| rowspan=2|Themselves
| Best New Band
| 
| 
|-
| rowspan=2|Q Awards
| Best New Act 
| 
|-
| "VCR"
| Best Track 
| 
|-
| rowspan=5|2011
| Ivor Novello Awards
| "Islands"
| Best Contemporary Song 
| 
|-
| BT Digital Music Awards
| The xx iPhone app
| Best Music App
| 
|-
| International Dance Music Awards
| "VCR" (Four Tet Remix)
| Best Alternative/Rock Dance Track
| 
| 
|-
| rowspan=3|Brit Awards
| xx
| British Album of the Year
| 
| rowspan=2|
|-
| rowspan=2|Themselves
| rowspan=2|British Group
| 
|-
| 2012
| 
| 
|-
| rowspan="4"|2013
| Independent Music Awards
| rowspan="2"|Coexist
| Best 'Difficult' Second Album
| 
|-
| A2IM Libera Awards 
| Independent Album of the Year
| 
|-
| Brit Awards
| rowspan="3"|Themselves
| Best British Group
| 
|-
| rowspan="2"|mtvU Woodie Awards
| Branching Out Woodie
| 
|-
| 2014
| Performing Woodie 
| 
|-
| rowspan="4"|2017
| A2IM Libera Awards 
| I See You
| Marketing Genius 
| 
| 
|-
| AIM Independent Music Awards
| "On Hold"
| Independent Track of the Year
| 
|-
| Q Awards
| Best Album 
| I See You
| 
|-
| rowspan="2"|Hungarian Music Awards
| "On Hold"
| rowspan="2"|Foreign Electronic Music Album or Sound Record 
| 
|-
| rowspan="4"|2018
| rowspan="2"| I See You
| 
|-
| rowspan="2"| Sweden GAFFA Awards
| Best Foreign Album
| 
|-
| rowspan="2"| Themselves
| Best International Group
| 
|-
| Brit Awards
| Best British Group
|

Discography

 xx (2009)
 Coexist (2012)
 I See You (2017)

Tours 
 The xx Tour (2009–10)
 Coexist Tour (2012–2014)
 I See You Tour (2017–2018)

References

Further reading

External links 

2005 establishments in England
British indie pop groups
Dream pop musical groups
English electronic rock musical groups
English electronic music groups
English pop music groups
Musical groups established in 2005
Musical groups from the London Borough of Wandsworth
British musical trios
Remixers
XL Recordings artists